Fondo del Sol Visual Arts Center, founded in 1973, was a non-profit visual arts center in Washington, D.C. It was the second oldest
Latino multicultural museum in the United States. The Center, whose focus was in the art and cultural heritage of the people of the Americas, was D.C.'s only multilingual museum and offered materials in both English, French, Russian and Spanish.  Fondo del Sol was a member of the Dupont-Kalorama Museums Consortium.

The museum was artist run and one of its annual highlights was the June Walk Week, a three-day audio-visual celebration of Hispanic art and culture.

References

External links

1973 establishments in Washington, D.C.
African-American history of Washington, D.C.
Afro-Caribbean culture in the United States
Afro-Latino culture in the United States
Arts centers in Washington, D.C.
Caribbean-American culture
Ethnic museums in Washington, D.C.
Hispanic and Latino American culture in Washington, D.C.
Latino museums in the United States
Multiculturalism in the United States
Museums established in 1973
Defunct museums in Washington, D.C.